Jo-Hanko de Villiers (born ) is a South African rugby union player for the  in Super Rugby, the  in the Currie Cup and the  in the Rugby Challenge. His regular position is eighth man.

References

South African rugby union players
Living people
1996 births
Rugby union players from Bloemfontein
Rugby union number eights
Golden Lions players
Rugby union flankers
Lions (United Rugby Championship) players
Griquas (rugby union) players